Gainous is a surname.  Notable people with the surname include:

 Fred Gainous (born 1947), American university president
 Gerald Gainous, American civilian notable for scaling the White House fence during the Ford administration